The Hotel Cecil was a grand hotel built 1890–96 between the Thames Embankment and the Strand in London, England. It was named after Cecil House (also known as Salisbury House), a mansion belonging to the Cecil family, which occupied the site in the 17th century. The hotel was largely demolished in 1930, and Shell Mex House now stands on its site.

History

Designed by architects Perry & Reed in a "Wrenaissance" style, the hotel was the largest in Europe when it opened, with more than 800 rooms.  The proprietor, Jabez Balfour, later went bankrupt and was sentenced to 14 years in prison.

The hotel provided accommodation and the base for Gandhi’s South African delegation campaigning for Indian rights in the Transvaal in 1906.

The hotel was requisitioned for the World War I war effort in 1917 by the Air Board, and the very first headquarters of the fledgling RAF took up part of the hotel from 1918 to 1919. 

Little more than a fortnight after the founding of the newly formed RAF on 1 April 1918, the French agent provocateur Bolo Pasha was shot for treason in France on 17 April. He had been attempting in 1916 to destabilise sections of the French press with the intention of forcing an early armistice, using German slush funds channelled via New York organised by Franz von Papen and the ambassador to Washington, Count von Bernstorff.

"Somehow his name tickled our curiously warped English sense of humour, and the office of the Air Board at the Hotel Cecil was nicknamed the Hotel Bolo, or the Bolo House. The reason given by the inventor of the name was that everybody in the Hotel Bolo was either actively interfering with the progress of the War, or was doing nothing to help its progress. So well was the nickname known that if one wanted to go to the Air Board, or later on to the Air Ministry, one merely told the taxi-driver to go to the Hotel Bolo, or the Bolo House, and he went without further question."

A green plaque was affixed just inside the outer Strand entrance to the building in March 2008, proclaiming: The Royal Air Force was formed and had its first headquarters here in the former Hotel Cecil 1 April 1918. Below it is a brass plate stating: This plaque was unveiled by the Chief of the Air Staff Air Chief Marshal Sir Glenn Torpy to mark the 90th anniversary of the formation of the Royal Air Force.

The hotel was the base for a Palestine Arab delegation that arrived in London in August 1921 and spent almost a year there, protesting in vain against the proposed terms of the British Mandate for Palestine. The president of the delegation was Musa Kazim al-Husseini; its secretary was Shibli al-Jamal; the other delegates were Tawfiq Hammad, Amin al-Tamimi, Ibrahim Shammas and Mu'in al-Madi; the assistant secretary was Dr Fu'ad Samad.

The Cecil was largely demolished in Autumn 1930, and Shell Mex House was built on the site.  The Strand range of the hotel remains (now occupied by shops and offices, including those of Interbrand), with, at its centre, a grandiose arch leading to the separate Shell Mex House behind. After Shell Mex relocated, the block became known as 80 Strand and is occupied by a number of companies including AIMIA and  Pearson PLC subsidiaries Financial Times, Penguin Books, Dorling Kindersley and Rough Guides.

References 

1896 establishments in England
1930 disestablishments in England
Hotel buildings completed in 1896
Defunct hotels in London
Hotel Cecil
Hotel Cecil
Hotels established in 1896
Demolished hotels in the United Kingdom
Buildings and structures demolished in 1930
Strand, London